Korangi District is one of the seven administrative districts of Karachi last modified in 2013, part of the Karachi Division in Sindh, Pakistan.

Map of Karachi Division

History 
The district was a part of District East in Karachi, which was divided in November 2013.

The district is diverse include Baloch, Pashtun, Sindhi, Punjabi and other ethnicities.

The district suffers from water crisis and contamination issues. A reverse osmosis plant was inaugurated in Union Council 35 of District Municipal Corporation (DMC) Korangi on 6 March 2017.

Demographics
At the time of the 2017 census, Korangi district had a population of 2,577,556, of which 1,347,161 were males and 1,229,899 females. The entire population was urban. The literacy rate is 80.19%: 81.56% for males and 78.68% for females.

The majority religion is Islam, with 95.90% of the population. Christianity is practiced by 3.51% of the population.

At the time of the 2017 census, 61.34% of the population spoke Urdu, 13.55% Punjabi, 5.80% Sindhi, 5.23% Pashto, 4.02% Saraiki and 3.55% Hindko as their first language.

Administrative towns
Korangi District has three administrative towns.

Korangi Town

Landhi Town

Shah Faisal Town

List of Dehs
The following is a list of Korangi District's dehs, organised by taluka:

 Shah Faisal taluka (2 dehs)
 Drigh
 Drigh Road
 Model Colony taluka (2 dehs)
 Mehran-II
 Thano-II
 Landhi taluka (2 dehs)
 Phihai-II
 Sahrafi-I
 Korangi taluka (2 dehs)
 Dih 
 Phihai-I

See also 

 Korangi
 Korangi Town
 Korangi District
 Korangi J Area
 Korangi Industrial Area
 Korangi Creek Cantonment
 Korangi (disambiguation)
 Korangi railway station

References

Districts of Karachi
Districts of Sindh